Mary Drake is a fictional character created by I. Marlene King for the American television series Pretty Little Liars, based on the novel series of the same name written by Sara Shepard and portrayed by Andrea Parker.

The identical twin sister of character Jessica DiLaurentis, Mary makes her first official introduction in the sixth-season finale "Hush, Hush, Sweet Liars". Mary is a former patient at Radley Sanitarium, a mental institution, as well as the biological mother of Charlotte Drake. In "The DArkest Knight", Drake is also revealed to be Spencer Hastings' biological mother. During "Till Death Do Us Part", the elusive A.D. is revealed to be Alex Drake, Spencer's younger identical twin sister and Mary's daughter.

Casting 
Andrea Parker had portrayed Jessica DiLaurentis since the second season before appearing as Mary, Jessica's identical twin. TVLine confirmed that Parker was added as a series regular for the seventh season.

Storylines

Background 
Mary Drake was born the twin sister of Jessica DiLaurentis. She allegedly began displaying mental health issues as a teenager after an incident took place at her sister's babysitting job when Jessica called Mary to replace her so she could go on a date instead. The baby accidentally died under Mary's care and she was sent to Radley Sanitarium, a mental institution, as a consequence. Mary told the baby's parents she hadn't even touched the boy and that it was her sister's fault, but no one believed her due to Jessica's previous manipulating people into thinking Mary was volatile. Mary was forced to stay in Radley until she was 18, however she was readmitted several times over the following decade. Mary met Ted Wilson when he was a senior student in college and they dated for a while until she became pregnant. She left without telling Ted she was carrying his child and eventually gave birth to their son Charles at Radley. The baby was then adopted by Jessica and Kenneth since they feared for the newborn's safety.

Several years later, Mary posed as her sister to sleep with Peter Hastings, whom previously had an affair with Jessica. Their brief sexual encounter resulted in another pregnancy, and Mary later gave birth to identical twins. The first born, Spencer Hastings, was taken from her and placed in the care of Peter and his wife, Veronica. The two were unaware of the existence of a second twin, Alex Drake, who was born minutes after they had left with Spencer. Mary, desperate to escape Radley, arranged for Doctor Cochran to sell Alex to a wealthy couple in England. 

Drake was permanently released from the psychiatric hospital when she was 28 years old, thanks to the money she had gotten from selling Alex. Not much is known about her whereabouts after checking out of Radley, only that she'd travelled a lot, especially around Europe and Latin America.

Mary briefly returned to Rosewood when her daughter Spencer was a senior student in Rosewood High, wanting to see how she looked. According to Peter, Drake asked him to help her get revenge on Jessica for lying about Charles having committed suicide in order to seclude his sex change. When he refused to assist her vendetta, she poisoned Jessica with Peter's medication. However, we later learn that Peter and Jessica had planned to use his heart medication pills to kill Mary and prevent her from seeing Spencer again. Drake came back once more after discovering that her firstborn had been murdered and began working with Elliott Rollins, Charlotte's lover, to avenge her homicide.

Season 4 
Drake's first known appearance in the series takes place in the episode "Cover for Me" when Mary (whom the audience believes to be Jessica) sneaks into Spencer's bedroom to get a good look at her. She later hides and exits the room unnoticed.

Season 6 
During "Did You Miss Me?", Drake appears dressed up as Jessica to visit her niece, Alison DiLaurentis, in the hospital, though the concussed Alison assumes it to be a nightmare.

Throughout "Hush, Hush, Sweet Liars", Mary and Alison's then-husband, Elliott, dress up as Jessica and the deceased corrupt detective Darren Wilden in order to drive Alison insane and trick her into checking herself in at the Welby State Psychiatric Hospital.

Season 7 
In "Tick-Tock, Bitches", the main characters of the series discover Mary's identity as Jessica's twin sister. Later, Mary visits the Hastings residence where she briefly talks to Spencer. 

During "Bedlam", Mary drives Hanna to Spencer's home, at her request. Later that day, she visits Spencer again at her workplace to find out if Hanna is doing alright. After some questions posed by Spencer, Drake tells her the story of how she ended up in Radley, resulting in an unexpected bond between the two of them. Visiting The Radley to unlock old memories, Mary encounters Emily and they discuss Alison's health issues. Drake assures Emily that Elliott is professional and thinks there is nothing to worry about. They decide to pay Alison a secret visit at Welby. There, both of them discover that Alison's mental state has worsened since she mistakes Mary for her deceased mother. After Elliott discovers their presence, he argues with Mary about their plans, as she thinks Elliott is crossing the line on Alison's mistreatment.

At the end of "Hit and Run, Run, Run", Mary pays another visit to Alison at Welby to inform her that she's "in charge" of things.

In "Along Comes Mary", Alison is released from Welby into the care of a relative, leaving her under the suspicious watch of Mary. Their interactions are initially tense since Alison questions her aunt's intentions and sudden return to Rosewood. Mary discloses to Alison that Archer Dunhill (Elliott's real identity) contacted her in London to inform that Charlotte had died just hours after her release from medical supervision. Archer also acknowledged his suspicions that Alison was accountable for her cousin's homicide. Mary admits that at first she too believed Alison was responsible for her daughter's murder, presuming she had inherited Jessica's ruthless nature but claims she stopped assisting Dunhill's schemes once he revealed his true colors. Later on the episode, the two bond over "Little Sparrow", a song Mary was heard humming around the DiLaurentis residence about betrayal and heartbreak caused by men, which coincides with Alison's current situation.

During "Wanted: Dead or Alive", Mary moves back to the Lost Woods Resort in fear of Archer potentially lurking around town and nearly bashes Spencer with a bat when she opens the door to her room unannounced. Drake realizes that Spencer suspects her of keeping Archer concealed and proceeds to tell her that he "handled Ali with kid gloves" compared to how he treated her. Later, when Mary drops by the DiLaurentis residence to return some items, Alison questions her aunt's relationship with Charlotte due to her cousin introducing herself with the pseudonym CeCe Drake. Mary is in shock to find out about her daughter's former alias, claiming they never met and that once Charlotte was born, Jessica immediately took the baby, not even allowing her sister to hold the newborn. Mary presumes that Charlotte discovered about her existence either on her own or through Jessica.

In "Original G'A'ngsters", Spencer and Hanna manage to break into Jenna Marshall's room at The Radley with Caleb's aid, but their investigation process is quickly interrupted by the sound of someone slowly opening the door. The person hides Mary's old Radley Sanitarium file inside a secret box under Jenna's bed and is revealed to be Noel Kahn, who is seen angrily dialing Dr. Cochran. Meanwhile, Jason DiLaurentis returns to Rosewood and tensions rise at the DiLaurentis residence when he corners Mary with a court order appointing him as Alison's primary caretaker. He initially expels Drake from the property but Alison manages to subdue her brother into getting to know their aunt. During an awkward family dinner with Aria Montgomery, Jason accuses Mary of being a master manipulator and she confesses to them that Jessica had told her Charles died as a teenager in order to withheld information about her son's transition into a woman. Drake also claims that her sister spent a lot of time locked in a storm cellar at their Aunt Carol's house. Later at night, the Liars but Aria go to investigate the location, and discover Jessica had turned it into her lair. Through photos, Alison realizes her mother knew she was alive and searched for her whereabouts. Jessica also kept files on all the Liars and had all of Mary's medical history. Whilst examining them, Emily discovers that Mary had a second child, Charlotte's biological sibling. Their gender is undisclosed, but the individual fits the same age pattern as the Liars.

During "Exes and OMGs", Spencer and Aria track down Dr. Cochran and meet his daughter whom he has a strained relationship with. She refuses to tell them where he lives until someone ransacks her home. Upon meeting Cochran, he is reluctant to discuss his past until the girls bribe him with whiskey. The man explains that his main function was to take care of "problems" such as unwanted pregnancies. He further admits that he was responsible for delivering both of Mary's children when she was hospitalized at Radley. Cochran also proceeds to reveal that her second child was placed in temporary custody at a department of county family services. Years passed and his job eventually caused him to be a liability, so Radley fired him and he lost his license as a doctor.

In "The Wrath of Kahn", Aria and Jason team up to investigate Mary's past and discover that Steven Kahn, Noel's father, was the judge who presided over her second child's adoption.

During "The DArkest Knight", Hanna Marin helds Noel hostage in an attempt to obtain a confession from him that proves he's their tormentor, but Kahn doesn't regain consciousness. Impatient, she instead ends up slashing one of his legs with a knife in order to test his DNA and see if it matches Mary's. The results later come back negative and Noel ends up escaping. The Liars all get a text message ordering them to head over to 1465, Elm Street. Once the girls arrive to the location, they make their way inside an abandoned school for blind students where they're held hostage by Kahn and Jenna, with the later tracking down the Liars at gunpoint. During the cat-and-mouse chase, Emily and Hanna end up fighting Noel which causes him to trip over an axe that decapitates him. Spencer is subsequently shot by an unknown assailant, giving Jenna the leverage to finish her off. Nonetheless, Mary emerges from behind and knocks out Jenna before she could do anything harmful. Whilst A.D. drags Jenna away from the building, the Liars stumble upon a severely wounded Spencer laying on Mary's arms. Presuming Drake is accountable for their friend's critical condition, Mary swears she'd never harm Spencer and tearfully claims to be her biological mother.

In "Playtime", it's revealed that Mary ran off from the abandoned school for blind students before the authorities and paramedics showed up at the scene to aid Spencer. A week later, Veronica Hastings arrives back in Rosewood, finally concluding the victory cruise she embarked on shortly after being elected State Senator of Pennsylvania. Spencer discloses to Veronica what Mary had told her and demands answers about her parentage. After initially resisting to her daughter's confrontation, Veronica proceeds to explain that one day she was working on her living room when Jessica DiLaurentis knocked on the door to have a discussion. Veronica avoided her neighbor at the time, due to Jason being a product of an affair with her husband Peter. Jessica presented to Mrs. Hastings a rundown of her troubled history with Mary. Veronica was initially puzzled as to why her husband's former mistress was telling her about a secret relative with "emotional problems" until Jessica unfolded that Mary was pregnant. Unlike her previous pregnancy, the medical staff at Radley was able to determine who the child's father was because Mary identified him. Mary had seemingly posed as Jessica at a restaurant where Peter was dining and tricked him into sleeping with her. The purpose of Jessica's visit was not only to come clean about her sister carrying on her affair but to also provide Veronica the option to adopt the baby. Veronica was distressed when she discovered that her husband had committed infidelity once more but couldn't stand the thought of Spencer being delivered at a psychiatric hospital and ultimately deserted. Shortly after Mary gave birth, Veronica alongside Peter made arrangements with Steven Kahn in order to gain custody of Spencer. According to Mrs. Hastings, caring for Spencer as if she were her own was the key to forgiving her marital disputes. Unable to process the truth on how she came to be, Spencer decides to distance herself from Veronica. Later in the episode, A.D. challenges Spencer to a truth or dare game, instructing her to pay a visit to Toby in order to gather a reward. After doing so, A.D. gifts Spencer with an old letter Mary wrote to her, stating that just because she's the outcome of a hateful act, doesn't make her vile.

During "These Boots Were Made for Stalking", Spencer asks for detective Marco Furey to stop by the Hasting's barn. Spencer's initially distraught and wrestling over whether or not to tell him the truth about Mary but shows Marco the letter Drake wrote to her, prior to giving birth. Afterwards, she asks for his help in tracking down Mary's whereabouts. He agrees to do so, and both head to the police station together. After a quick search, Marco determines that Drake might've signed into a motel under a different name but not much has been uncovered.

In "Power Play", Spencer arrives at her barn only to stumble upon her father's belongings. Amongst Peter's luggage, she finds his passport and discovers that he arrived in Philadelphia at the same time as Veronica. Peter suddenly emerges and Spencer engages in a heated argument with her dad, questioning him as to why he chose to avoid his own daughter. Peter divulges that he was searching for Mary's whereabouts and trying to assure she wouldn't return to Rosewood to cause more damage to their family. He further explains that he wanted to find a way to redeem himself after the emotional rollercoaster he put his daughter and wife through. When Spencer asks him if he was able to successfully track down Drake, Peter replies that he's working with a private investigator in order to do so. Spencer rebukes her father for attempting to chase Mary away, and storms out. The following day, Hanna is hanging out at Spencer's house when she spots the P.I.’s business card from Peter’s briefcase. She convinces Spencer to infiltrate the investigation in order to locate Drake, and theorizes that Mary might be able to help point them in the direction of “A.D.". Afterwards, Hanna picks up the phone and calls the P.I., pretending to be someone from Peter's office. After getting help from the P.I., Hanna and Spencer knock on several doors until they approach one house and much to their surprise, Pastor Ted Wilson (Hanna's former step-dad) opens the door. The girls show Ted a picture of Drake and ask him if he has seen her, to which Wilson informs them that he hasn't. Hanna offers to grab coffee with Ted at the Radley later to catch up, and she also asks him to call her if he happens to spot Mary. As the Liars turn away to leave, Drake shows up in the doorway. Ted turns to Drake and questions her on what she's truly doing there. Later, he reaches out to Hanna to talk and they meet up at Lucas' loft, where Wilson reveals to have lied about Mary's visit. Ted further confesses that Drake is an ex-girlfriend of his back when he was a college student and that she met up with him to inform they had a child together. Things get even more intricate when Wilson discloses to Hanna that said offspring was Charlotte and that he knew his daughter prior to her sex change. It turns out that Ted used to run a summer camp for troubled boys, and Charles was a camper there. Wilson is disheartened when describing that he interacted with a "soft-spoken, sweet" boy without awareness they were related. Ted then showcases Hanna a picture of himself back when he worked at the camp, chaperoning Charles and Lucas Gottesman, whom he described as his son's "only friend". This shocking revelation leaves Hanna stunned. Later, when Spencer arrives home, she is reprehended by her father, who is mad that she spent the entire day looking for Drake. Peter claims that Mary's behavior in the past suggests she's unhinged. When Spencer demands her father to expose whatever knowledge he has on Mary, Peter finally gives in and discloses that the last time he saw Drake was after Spencer came back from rehab. Peter was in the kitchen drinking a glass of wine when he spotted whom he presumed to be Jessica quietly descending the staircase and making her way to the front door. Just before she exited, Peter turned the lights on and confronted her, until the woman explained to her former lover that she needed to see their daughter, prompting him to realize that it was actually Mary. Peter further clarifies that Mary pursued retribution after Jessica told her that Charles committed suicide in order to withhold information about his transition into a woman. After Peter refused to aid Drake on her vendetta, Mary used Peter's heart medication pills to poison her sister. At last, Spencer comprehends her father's concern, seeing as Drake wanted to blame Peter for Jessica's murder. That being said, Spencer is disappointed to learn that Peter knew about Charlotte's connection to their family prior to exposing herself as "A". He then assures his daughter that despite her hard feelings, he'll always guard her from harm.

During "In the Eye Abides the Heart", Spencer visits Marco at the police station to bring him a box of cupcakes and make small talk about Archer's severed finger that A.D. sent the authorities. Furey reveals that he spoke with a nurse at Welby and learned that Mary and Archer had an argument right before he went missing. Marco deduces that Drake might have been involved in Archer's murder, but his suspicions also lean towards Spencer. When Spencer returns home later that day, she immediately realizes that someone trespassed her house. Sure enough, the front door to the barn is ajar and a bottle is poised in front of it, with a note sticking out at the top. She unravels it quickly, only to reveal a message from Mary that states “Need to talk.” Spencer writes a response and sticks the paper back inside the bottle. The following day, Hanna pulls out the box where she previously found Lucas's mysterious comic book he wrote with Charlotte, only to realize that it's missing. Hanna immediately dials Spencer to inform her, but she dismisses her quickly in favor of opening up the latest note from Drake, which contains a single gold key. At night, Spencer unlocks a door at the Lost Woods Resort and stumbles upon a pile of mail right at the foot of the doorway. Suddenly, she hears a noise outside, and Furey walks in. He divulges to have followed her, realizing that Spencer was planning on meeting Mary at the motel. Marco shares that every theory he has about Dunhill's death somehow links back to Spencer and the other Liars. To make matters worse, Furey discloses that he ordered copies of Archer's paper receipts to inspect the signature. Spencer immediately realizes that she accidentally used Archer's credit card to pay for the drinks that she and Marco shared that night. Spencer proceeds to exit the Lost Woods abruptly. At the end of the episode, she receives one more note from Drake that says "You brought the police. I understand. Goodbye." It turns out that Mary waited for her daughter at the resort but when she spotted Furey, she assumed Spencer had tipped him off.

In "Driving Miss Crazy", A.D. blackmails Aria into placing a burner phone with a pre-made audio recording to play over a sound system at the Hastings residence. The recording ends up being a secret conversation between Mary and Peter, which ultimately reveals that Peter and her sister were plotting to kill her. This leaves Peter in a rage, who begins to frantically search for Drake around the house, thinking that she might have planted the recording. He tears the speakers off the walls, instructing his wife and daughter not to listen to the "delusional ramblings" of a mentally unstable individual. After hearing the conversation playing on a loop, Veronica considers contacting the authorities but Spencer persuades her mother not to call the police. Later at night, Marco confronts Spencer outside her home, after learning that she is Caleb's ex-girlfriend. Furey further points out their romantic involvement gives Caleb enough motivation to protect her and cause a flood at The Radley that destroyed all of the hotel's security footage. Spencer threatens to embarrass Marco at the police station with personal details about their relationship, prompting him to drive off. After she gets in her car, Drake who was hiding in the backseat, covers Spencer's mouth and orders her to drive to the Lost Woods in order to explain her version of events. Mary denies planting the recorded conversation at the Hastings household, but isn't regretful Spencer heard it. After Spencer points out how Drake committed a heinous crime, Mary tells her not to judge. Through a flashback, we learn that Drake was told by Peter she would never see their daughter again. Peter and Jessica came up with a plan to use Peter's heart medication pills to kill her. Mary thwarted the plan and killed Jessica with his pills. Feeling like she was cheated out of the chance to know Spencer, Drake asks her daughter to come live under the radar with her. Afterwards, Spencer goes home to confront her father. When she gets there, her parents are reading the letter Mary wrote to her. Peter, once again, tries to warn Spencer that Drake is manipulating her. Spencer alludes to her dad's involvement in the murder plot against Mary, but Peter makes no apologies for his actions. He clears up that his intention was to protect his family from a "deranged sociopath", and that he'd do so again if necessary. Peter storms out and Veronica informs Spencer that she is dropping out of the Senate due to fear of Peter's wrongdoings becoming public knowledge. Spencer meets up with Drake again, but this time it's to say goodbye. Mary assures Spencer she understands, and in return she implores her biological mother to forgive herself in order to move on with her life.

During "Farewell, My Lovely", Spencer notices a message from Drake in a wine bottle while she was with the other Liars. Following its instructions, Spencer headed to the Lost Woods where she found Mary awaiting her. Preparing to leave town, Drake divulges to her daughter that she put the resort's deed in her name and Alison's so they could use it for money in case they needed legal assistance. Mary further states that preventing Lieutenant Tanner from obtaining arrest warrants for her family was the least she could do. Later that day, Mona confesses to having murdered Charlotte after realizing that her mental health hadn't improved and her true intentions were to torture the Liars again. This revelation led to the final pieces of the puzzle being left for the Liars to find on Hanna's car. They placed the pieces into the board game, which A.D. had moved to the DiLaurentis residence. The phone from the game bid the Liars congratulations and through augmented reality informed them the grand prize was to discover Archer's corpse buried at Carol Ward's house. The girls rushed over there with shovels to dig the body up but Aria persuades her friends to stop playing the game and walk away. As they did, Tanner and the authorities turned up and the girls were all taken into custody. Fearing that they were about to be charged with first degree murder, the Liars are shocked to observe Drake in the interrogation room confessing to the murders of Dunhill and Jessica. While the Liars (minus Alison) knew she was accountable for her sister's homicide, they were shocked to witness Mary take the fall for Archer's involuntary vehicular manslaughter. Tanner allows the girls to walk away free but made it clear that she knew Drake wasn't accountable for Dunhill's death. Spencer tearfully watches Mary get taken away and whilst the two briefly make eye contact, Drake puts her finger to her lips, instructing Spencer not to stop her from sparing them a prison sentence.

In "Till Death Do Us Part", a year has passed since A.D. went off the radar after obtaining closure in relation to Charlotte's murder. Mary, now an inmate, receives a visit from her daughter Alex, posing as Spencer, who asks for a favor. Later that day, A.D. orders Mona to walk around in a mask of Melissa Hastings' face to gain their trust. After successfully obeying their orders, Vanderwaal heads to Spencer's barn to knock her unconscious. Thereupon, Spencer wakes up in a cell and looks at what she believes to be a mirror. Alex, unable to keep up the ruse, quits impersonating a reflection. Spencer is visibly puzzled, and Alex startles her. She starts laughing gleefully as Mary walks up behind her and makes her way into Spencer's room, where she states they didn't think she'd wake up so early. Mary then injects Spencer with a sedative, causing her to fall asleep instantaneously. A few hours later, Spencer awakens once more, only this time attached to a holter monitor and with a foot chained to a bed. She comes face to face with Alex in tremendous stupefaction, who informs Spencer that their mother is preparing a special lunch for the three of them. Alex proceeds to share with Spencer details about the circumstances that lead to avenging their half-sister's memory before leaving for Aria and Ezra's wedding. A few hours later, Mary suddenly shows up to deliver Spencer's lunch and is met with accusations of having a helping hand in Alex's maneuvers. Mary reminds Spencer that she's a wanted convict for a murder she didn't commit. This causes Spencer to ask where they are but Mary is unaware of the location, however, Drake mentions that Alex promised to keep both of them secure. Spencer interrogates Mary on why she never told her about Alex's existence, to which Mary declares being unsure whether Alex was alive or not until she paid her a visit a few weeks earlier. According to Mary, the existence of a second twin was unbeknownst to the Hastings, since Alex was born minutes after Spencer had already been given to Peter and Veronica. Mary, desperate to escape Radley, allowed Doctor Cochran to arrange Alex's adoption in exchange for $500,000 and a resignation from the psychiatric hospital. Alex was later adopted by a wealthy British couple. However, she started to develop mental health problems at an early age, and the family that fostered her refused to tarnish their reputation. Alex was then stripped off her adoptive name and placed into an orphanage under her birth name. On her tenth birthday, Alex ran away from the Ambrose Home for Wayward Children, a year before Mary discovered she was there. Drake proceeds to unlock the code to Spencer's cell and the two share an emotional embrace. Spencer takes advantage of the momentum to steal one of Mary's hair pins and then uses it to pick the locks of her and Ezra's rooms. Later that day, Alex is then spotted angrily leaving a house with Mary in tow. Mary points out that Alex promised she wouldn't injure Spencer, and she angrily proclaims her need to dispose of "the proof" before grabbing an ax off the side of the building. Drake states that if they leave straightaway, they can arrange a mother-daughter trip to Europe. Alex insists that she's not going anywhere without Toby and claims he's in love with her. Mary responds that Toby's in love with Spencer, which causes Alex to furiously yell that she already became her sister. Mary notifies Alex that she knows what it feels like to want something so badly that you start to believe it's true. Alex wisecracks that she can't fathom her mother's words and punches Mary in the nose, knocking her out. Through Mona's assistance, Alex is eventually caught by the other Liars, Toby and Caleb and brought into custody by a police officer. Vanderwaal reveals that the elusive figure in a black hoodie who paid her a visit at Welby earlier in the episode was Wren Kingston, hellbent on killing her under Alex's orders. However, Mona persuaded A.D. into sparing her life by helping Mary escape prison. At an unknown time, Vanderwaal is seen running a doll store in France. Once she finishes selling an item to a customer, the officer who arrested Alex and Mary walks inside to greet Mona with a kiss, implying they were somehow in cahoots. They make ensuing dinner plans and after he exits the shop, Vanderwaal heads to a basement. A dollhouse is set up with two dolls seated in the upper division, to which Mona voices that it's tea-time before handing them a toy teapot. Behind the dollhouse, a light goes on in a room that shows Alex and Mary, who are costumed as life-sized dolls while sipping tea together. Alex unleashes a heavy sigh, and Mary professes to her daughter that Vanderwaal can't hold them hostage indefinitely. Alex, embracing the unavoidable, rolls her eyes and elucidates, "Of course she can, she's Mona". She then irritably glares through the glass at Vanderwaal, who is also sipping tea and looking utterly satisfied, knowing she has finally taken control of the "A" game again and owns two dolls of her own.

Notes

References 

Pretty Little Liars characters
Female characters in television
Television characters introduced in 2014
Fictional murderers
Fictional twins
Fictional identical twins